Peter Michael St Clair Harvey (16 September 19442 March 2013) was an Australian journalist and broadcaster. Harvey was a long-serving correspondent and contributor with the Nine Network from 1975 to 2013.

Career
Harvey studied his journalism cadetship with the Sydney newspaper The Daily Telegraph and won a Walkley Award in 1964. He worked at radio stations 2UE and 2GB before moving to London and working for BBC Radio. He then went on to The Guardian (where he received the British Reporter of the Year Award for a series of articles about the sale of confidential information) and the American Newsweek magazine as a reporter in Vietnam during the Vietnam War.

Harvey changed to television when he joined the Nine Network in 1973 and served as its news director in the network's Canberra bureau for many years.  One of his first major stories was the dismissal of Prime Minister Gough Whitlam in November 1975.

It was from this work, and his regular political reporting on Nine's flagship nightly news bulletins, that his sonorous closing line of "Peter Harvey, Canberra" and deep baritone voice became something of a catchphrase and was lampooned by numerous comedians, including Australian television's Full Frontal and The Late Show.

Harvey also reported for the network from numerous international trips by Australian prime ministers and was based in Saudi Arabia in 1990 with American forces at the commencement of the first Gulf War. He transferred from Canberra to the network's Sydney headquarters in February 1997. In later years he contributed to Today and 60 Minutes, where he presented a weekly viewers' feedback segment.

Harvey was awarded a Centenary Medal in 2001, for service to Australian society in journalism. He was posthumously inducted into the Logie Hall of Fame on 27 April 2014.

Illness and death
On 11 October 2012, Harvey announced that he had been diagnosed with pancreatic cancer. He stated that he had found out about his illness three weeks earlier when he was holidaying in Venice with his wife.

On 2 March 2013, Harvey died at North Shore Private Hospital in Sydney at the age of 68.

Personal life
Harvey was born and raised in Bellevue Hill near Bondi in Sydney. He was married to Anne and had two children, Claire and Adam, who both went into careers in journalism. Claire is deputy editor of The Sunday Telegraph newspaper and Adam is a reporter for the Australian Broadcasting Corporation in Sydney.  Adam's wife Eliza is a daughter of journalist Geraldine Doogue, from her first marriage with Tim Blue.

In a 2008 interview, Harvey stated, "I believe very strongly in God and Jesus Christ, but not so much on organised religion. I had a boarding school knock that out of me."

References

1944 births
2013 deaths
60 Minutes (Australian TV program) correspondents
Australian political journalists
Australian radio journalists
Australian television journalists
Australian war correspondents
Deaths from cancer in New South Wales
Deaths from pancreatic cancer
Logie Award winners
Newsweek people
Nine News presenters
Recipients of the Centenary Medal
The Guardian journalists
Walkley Award winners
War correspondents of the Vietnam War